Renée van Dongen, professionally known as Charlie Dée (born 1977), is a Dutch singer-songwriter from Rotterdam. She won De Grote Prijs van Nederland in 2004 and released her debut album Where Do Girls Come From in 2006 and a year later Love Your Life followed. "Ten Thousand Times" (a digitally released single) is a duet with Huub van der Lubbe, lead singer of De Dijk. Charlie Dée can also be heard on a balladeer's second album Where Are You, Bambi Woods? (2008). In the summer of 2008 she does a small Joni Mitchell tribute tour.

Discography

Albums 

Where Do Girls Come From (2006)
Love Your Life (2007)
A Tribute to Joni Mitchell (2009)
Husbands and Wives (2010)

Singles

Hello Hello (2006)
One Way Ticket (2006)
If I Ever Knew (2006)
I Know (2007)
Love Your Life (2007)
Ten Thousand Times (2008) [Charlie Dée & Huub van der Lubbe]
Have It All (2009)
Have It All (DJ Tiësto Remix) (2011)

EP's
A Tribute To Joni EP (2008)

References

External links
Official website

1977 births
Living people
Dutch singer-songwriters
Musicians from Rotterdam
21st-century Dutch singers
21st-century Dutch women singers
Birdman Records artists